Arli National Park, often called Arly, is a national park located in Tapoa Province, southeastern Burkina Faso. It adjoins Benin's Pendjari National Park in the south and the Singou Reserve in the west.

Geography and history

It is home to around 200 African elephants, 200 hippos and 100 lions. There are also buffaloes, baboons, red and green monkeys, warthogs, and various antelopes, such as the western hartebeest and roan antelope. There are also bushbucks, duikers and waterbuck.

The park can be accessed via the N19 highway via Diapaga (in the dry season also via Pama). Arli National Park has several pools, such as Tounga where there is a waterhole and there are two pools which are often visited by up to twenty hippos.

The park was earlier a habitat for the West African wild dog (Lycaon pictus manguensis), although this canid is likely extirpated from the local area due to an expanding human population, and a lack of national protection.

See also
 Arly-Singou
 W National Park

References

External links
 Africa Tour Operators

National parks of Burkina Faso
Ramsar sites in Burkina Faso